The 2021 Women's EuroHockey Championship II was the ninth edition of the Women's EuroHockey Championship II, the second level of the women's European field hockey championship organized by the European Hockey Federation. It was held from 15 to 21 August 2021 in Prague, Czech Republic.

The top five teams qualified for the European qualifier for the 2022 Women's FIH Hockey World Cup.

Belarus won their second EuroHockey Championship II title by defeating France 1–0 in the final. Poland won the bronze medal by defeating Wales 4–1.

Qualified teams
Participating nations have qualified based on their final ranking from the 2019 competition.

Umpires
The following nine umpires were appointed for the tournament by the EHF:

Preliminary round

Pool A

Pool B

Fifth to eighth place classification

Pool C
The points obtained in the preliminary round against the other team are taken over.

First to fourth place classification

Bracket

Semi-finals

Third place game

Final

Statistics

Final standings

Goalscorers

See also
2021 Men's EuroHockey Championship II
2021 Women's EuroHockey Championship III
2021 Women's EuroHockey Nations Championship

References

Women's EuroHockey Championship II
Women 2
EuroHockey Championship II
International women's field hockey competitions hosted by the Czech Republic
EuroHockey Championship II
Sports competitions in Prague
2020s in Prague
2021 in Czech women's sport